Agrostis thurberiana is a species of grass that is native to northwest and southwest United States and Canada (the Aleutian Islands, Alaska, British Columbia, Colorado, Oregon, Washington and California).

Description

They also have scaberulous veins and acute apexes. The hilum is linear while the fruits are caryopses with an additional pericarp.

Distribution
It is native to the west of North America, from the Aleutian Islands to California. In California, it is found growing along with lodgepole pine and red, and subalpine firs on various wetlands.

References

thurberiana
Flora of the Aleutian Islands
Flora of Alaska
Flora of British Columbia
Flora of Colorado
Flora of Oregon
Flora of Washington (state)
Flora of California
Flora without expected TNC conservation status